Wandri Dam, is an earthfill dam on Wandri river near Palghar, Thane district in the state of Maharashtra in India.

Specifications

Purpose
 Irrigation

See also
 Dams in Maharashtra
 List of reservoirs and dams in India

References

Dams in Palghar district
Dams completed in 1987
Tourist attractions in Palghar district
1987 establishments in Maharashtra